Hes or HES may refer to:
 Harry Edward Styles
 Environment, health and safety
 Harbour Air Seaplanes, a Canadian airline
 Harvard Extension School
 Health Survey for England
 Hermiston Municipal Airport in Oregon, United States
 HES School of Economics and Business, in Amsterdam, Netherlands
 Hessle railway station, in England
 Historic Environment Scotland
 Historical European swordsmanship
 Home Energy Saver, an online home energy analysis tool
 Home Energy Station
 Home Entertainment Suppliers
 Homosexualités et Socialisme, a faction within the Parti Socialiste in France
 Hospital Episode Statistics, an NHS database in England
 Huayu Enrichment Scholarship, in Taiwan
 Human embryonic stem cell
 Human Engineered Software, an early 1980s American video game publisher
 Hydroxyethyl starch
 Hypereosinophilic syndrome
 Hypertext Editing System
 Isis, an Egyptian goddess
 Vilém Heš (1860-1908), Czech operatic bass
 Harry Edward Styles
 Habbo Evolution Soccer
 Hybrid Energy Saving